Disconnected, released on August 6, 2002 by Atlantic Records, is the only studio album released by American rock band The Buzzhorn on a major label. The song "Ordinary" was an international hit single and appeared on the soundtrack of the 2002 video game Need for Speed: Hot Pursuit 2.

Track listing
"To Live Again" - 4:08
"Ordinary" - 3:09
"Satisfied" - 3:20
"Pinned to the Ground" - 4:00
"Out of My Hands" - 3:35
"Isn't This Great" - 3:32
"Disconnected" - 2:49
"Come See Me" - 3:28
"Rhino" - 3:16
"Waste of a Man" - 4:02
"Carry Me Home" - 3:13
"Holy Man" - 5:45
Total length: 44:17

References

2002 albums
Atlantic Records albums
The Buzzhorn albums
Albums produced by Howard Benson